Thomas Grimshaw Howarth (1879–1959) was an English professional footballer who played as a wing half for Burnley in the early 1900s.

Career statistics

References

English footballers
Association football wing halves
Burnley F.C. players
English Football League players
1959 deaths
1879 births
Brentford F.C. players
Southern Football League players
People from Nelson, Lancashire